Soslan may refer to:

 Soslan, a Russian/Uzbek/Ossetian male given name
 Soslan, the Ossetian name of Sosruko, a character in Caucasian mythology
 David Soslan, an Alan prince involved in Georgia's 12th century wars